The  is a school located in Yana, Kisarazu City, Chiba Prefecture, Japan. As of 1995, it was a Roman Catholic institution, and Tagawa was a member of the clergy.

The main school has two integrated departments, one section conducted predominantly in English, with supplementary French and Japanese instruction, and the other conducted entirely in Japanese. The school is a complete primary and secondary educational system, with six years for elementary, three for junior high, and three for high school.

Parallel to the two departments is the "Yohane" program, which is an experimental school where the students study at their own pace and choose their own courses of study.  Teachers for this department are employed as counselors for the students, rather than conducting conventional classes.

History
Gyosei International Senior High School was established in 1979 by those operating Gyosei High School in Kudan, Tokyo. In 1981 the junior high school division opened on a shared site with the high school. In 1984 the two schools were re-established as a separate entity.

Notable alumni

Entertainment
Masatoshi Akihara, film director
Kuro Tanino, theatre director
Asahi Uchida, actor
Sakurako Okubo, actress
Yuuki Yamamoto, model
Yuta Takahata, actor
Luke Hasegawa, artist.

Athletes
Ryota Aikawa, baseball player
Reo Kunimoto, footballer
Michihiro Ogasawara, baseball player

See also

 Gyosei International School UK (defunct international school in England)
 Gyosei International College in the U.K. (defunct post-secondary college in England)

References

External links
Gyosei International School Official Website (Japanese Language)

Schools in Chiba Prefecture
High schools in Chiba Prefecture
Private schools in Japan
International schools in Japan
1979 establishments in Japan
Educational institutions established in 1979
Elementary schools in Japan